The Serbian Progressive Party (SNS) has been the ruling political party of Serbia since 2012.

Founded by Tomislav Nikolić and Aleksandar Vučić in 2008 as a split from the far-right Serbian Radical Party, SNS served in parliamentary opposition to the Democratic Party until 2012. Running on an anti-corruption platform, it managed a strong performance in the 2009 Belgrade local elections, and in the same year, became the strongest opposition party. After signing a cooperation agreement with New Serbia, Movement of Socialists, and Strength of Serbia Movement, it organised protests in 2011, demanding early parliamentary elections. General elections were called for May 2012, in which SNS won 25% of the popular vote, while Nikolić was elected president. SNS formed a government with the Socialist Party of Serbia (SPS) and the United Regions of Serbia, with Vučić serving as the first deputy prime minister. After accusing businessman Miroslav Mišković of corruption and arresting him, Vučić called for early parliamentary elections to be held in March 2014. SNS campaigned on an anti-corruption platform while criticising its opponents, which led to SNS winning 158 out of 250 seats in the National Assembly. Vučić was elected prime minister after the election, while Siniša Mali was elected mayor of Belgrade after the 2014 City Assembly election. The first major anti-government protests under the SNS took place in 2015, in which demonstrators called for the termination of the Belgrade Waterfront, an urban development project headed by the government.

Another early parliamentary election was called for April 2016; SNS campaigned on ensuring economic reforms and supporting the European Union. It won 131 seats in the National Assembly and 63 out of 120 seats in the provincial election in Vojvodina; Vučić was re-elected prime minister, while Igor Mirović was elected president of the government of Vojvodina. Vučić was chosen by SNS as its presidential candidate for the 2017 presidential election, in which he won 55% of the popular vote in the first run-off; mass protests were held until his inauguration on 31 May 2017. Ana Brnabić succeeded Vučić as prime minister. Zoran Radojičić replaced Mali as mayor after the March 2018 City Assembly election, while later that year, a series of anti-government protests began; demonstrators demanded more media freedom and an end to political violence. SNS launched a campaign in February 2019 which effectively silenced the protests. The major opposition Alliance for Serbia boycotted the 2020 parliamentary election, which led SNS to win a supermajority of 188 seats; CeSID stated that the election was met with "minimum democratic standards", while OSCE noted the presence of political polarisation. Brnabić formed a government with SPS and the Serbian Patriotic Alliance; the latter merged into SNS in May 2021. The SNS-led government was faced with environmental protests in 2021 and early 2022, while the constitutional changes that it proposed were voted in favour by a majority of voters in the January 2022 constitutional referendum. In the 2022 Serbian general election, Vučić was re-elected with 60% of the popular vote, while SNS won 120 seats in the National Assembly; Aleksandar Šapić was elected mayor of Belgrade after the City Assembly election.

Scholars and political scientists consider SNS a populist party, with some stating that it does not have a coherent ideology or that it has a weak ideological profile. The party is supportive of Serbia's accession to the European Union, although political scientists have noted that its support is rather pragmatic. SNS has been also described as a catch-all party, while some have positioned it as either a centrist, centre-right, or a right-wing party. SNS is economically neoliberal; it advocates for austerity, privatisation, and liberalisation of labour laws. Critics have assessed that after it came to power, Serbia has suffered from democratic backsliding into authoritarianism, as well as a decline in media freedom and civil liberties, with the V-Dem Institute categorising Serbia as an electoral autocracy and Freedom House categorising it as a hybrid regime. As of 2020, SNS has at least 800,000 members and is the largest political party in Europe by membership.

History

Formation 

The conflict between Tomislav Nikolić and Vojislav Šešelj came to light after Nikolić's statement that the Serbian Radical Party (SRS), a far-right political party, in the National Assembly would support the Stabilisation and Association Process agreement for the accession of Serbia to the European Union; Nikolić's statement was met with the resistance from Šešelj and his supporters. Nikolić, who was the head of the SRS parliamentary group and a deputy president of the party since 1992, resigned from these posts on 7 September 2008. A day later, Nikolić formed the "Forward, Serbia" parliamentary group with 10 other MPs; five more MPs joined the parliamentary group in the following days. Božidar Delić and Jorgovanka Tabaković, high-ranking members of SRS, were one of the founding members of the parliamentary group.

On 11 September, Nikolić announced that the "Forward, Serbia" parliamentary group would transform itself into a political party. It was speculated that Aleksandar Vučić, the general-secretary of SRS, would join the newly-formed party; Nikolić later that day confirmed that he would join the party. A day later, SRS dismissed Nikolić and 17 other MPs from the party due to their opposition to Šešelj, while Vučić left SRS on 13 September. Nikolić stated that the newly-formed party would be the party of the "modern right", whilst supporting strengthening relations with the European Union and Russia. On 24 September, Nikolić announced that the party would be called the Serbian Progressive Party (SNS). SNS was registered as a political party on 10 October, while the founding convention was held on 21 October, in which a 20-man presidency was presented with Nikolić as the president and Vučić as deputy president. By that period, SNS mostly received support from SRS members, while the SNS parliamentary group sat at 21 MPs.

2008–2011 

In November 2008, SNS called for snap parliamentary elections to be held by October 2009; this proposal was also later supported by Čedomir Jovanović, leader of the Liberal Democratic Party (LDP). Later that month, Vučić stated that SNS would act in opposition to the Democratic Party (DS). SNS opposed the initiative regarding constitutional changes in May 2009, which it described as "frivolous". A month later, SNS took part in local elections in Zemun, a Belgrade municipality known for being the stronghold of SRS; SNS won 34% of the popular vote, while SRS only won 10%. By July 2009, SNS established itself as the strongest opposition party in Serbia. It took part in local elections in Voždovac and Kostolac in December 2009; in Voždovac, it won 37% of the popular vote and 26 seats in the Local Assembly, while in Kostolac it won 12% of the popular vote. Following the elections, SNS formed a local government with the Democratic Party of Serbia (DSS) and New Serbia (NS) in Voždovac. CeSID, a non-governmental and electoral monitoring organisation, argued that the reason behind their electoral success was due to their anti-corruption promises.

SNS announced in February 2010 that it collected over 500,000 signatures in favour of snap parliamentary elections; a month later, it claimed that the number grew to over a million signatures. After March 2010, SNS claimed that DS "was pulling the country into a deep crisis", and that in response it would hold anti-government protests in Belgrade. It announced in December 2010, that it would organise protests in February 2011; NS also stated that it would join the protests. SNS handed over 304,580 signatures in favour of changing the constitution in January 2011. A series of anti-government protests that were organised by SNS began in February 2011. SNS demanded the government to call snap elections by December 2011. Initially the protests were held in Belgrade, although they spread through out other locations in Serbia in March and April 2011. Nikolić went on a hunger strike in mid-April, after demanding president Boris Tadić to call snap parliamentary elections.

2012–2013 

Back in November 2010, SNS signed a cooperation agreement with NS and two other parties, the Movement of Socialists (PS) and Strength of Serbia Movement (PSS). The parties later held a meeting in February 2011 and took part together in protests that were organised by SNS. The protests played a role in boosting the popularity of SNS, while opinion polls had showed that SNS received more support from voters than DS. Due to the anti-government protests, President Tadić called for general elections to be held in spring of 2012. In January 2012, it was confirmed that SNS would take part in a joint parliamentary list together with NS, PS, PSS, and eight minor parties and associations. The coalition was later dubbed "Let's Get Serbia Moving". Nikolić was chosen as the presidential candidate of SNS, while Tabaković was chosen as the candidate for prime minister. During the campaign period, SNS criticised DS whilst campaigning on a pro-European platform, as well as promising to "correct the mistakes of DS". Rudy Giuliani, the former mayor of New York City, met with Nikolić and Vučić during the campaign period in Belgrade to consult with them. In the parliamentary election, the SNS-led coalition topped at the first place with 25% of the popular vote and won 73 seats in the National Assembly; SNS itself won 55 seats. Nikolić accused DS of vote fraud; during a press conference he showed a bag with about three thousand ballots that were allegedly thrown into a trash can. In the presidential election, Nikolić ended up in a run-off against President Tadić; Nikolić ended up winning the second run-off. SNS did not receive the highest amount of votes in the provincial and Belgrade City Assembly elections, and was unable to form governments in Vojvodina and Belgrade. On 24 May 2012, Nikolić resigned as the president of SNS and was succeeded by Vučić, who was then later elected in September 2012; Tabaković was also elected deputy president.

Nikolić held consultations with parliamentary parties after the election. After the consultations, Ivica Dačić, the leader of the Socialist Party of Serbia (SPS), was given the mandate to form a government. Dačić reached a deal with SNS and the United Regions of Serbia (URS), and on 27 July the new government was sworn in. Vučić became the first deputy prime minister. After becoming the first deputy prime minister, Vučić entered into a conflict with oligarch businessman Miroslav Mišković; he claimed that Mišković allegedly "gained illegal profit" in the 2000s. Mišković was arrested in December 2012 on suspicion of corruption, although in July 2013 he was released from custody. In October 2012, it was reported that SNS had over 330,000 members. The People's Party (NP), led by former mayor of Novi Sad Maja Gojković, merged into SNS in December 2012. By February 2013, SNS received over 40% of support in opinion polls, while DS, now in opposition, had 13% of support. In July 2013, SNS and SPS concluded that they would continue leading the government without URS; the SNS–SPS government was then reshuffled in early September 2013. Veroljub Arsić, who served as the head of the SNS parliamentary group, was replaced by Zoran Babić in August 2013. A month later, Dragan Đilas, the mayor of Belgrade, was dismissed after a vote of no confidence that was called by SNS and DSS; SPS and the Party of United Pensioners of Serbia (PUPS) also voted in support of the vote. Guy de Launey, a BBC News correspondent, Dragoljub Žarković, the co-founder of the Vreme newspaper, and journalist Koča Pavlović, stated that Vučić held the most influence and power in the government due to his status as the president of the largest party in the coalition government. Freedom House, a non-profit research organisation, noted that the efforts to curb corruption during 2013 received mixed results.

2014–2016 

SNS held an assembly on 26 January 2014 during which Vučić was re-elected unopposed as the party's president. At the assembly, he proposed to "test the will of the people" and called for a snap parliamentary election. President Nikolić dissolved the National Assembly on 29 January and set the parliamentary election to be held on 16 March 2014. In February, SNS presented its ballot list under the name "Future We Believe In". Additionally, it was announced that the Social Democratic Party of Serbia (SDPS), Serbian Renewal Movement (SPO), and Christian Democratic Party of Serbia (DHSS) would appear on its list, alongside NS, PS, and PSS, who appeared on the SNS list in 2012. SNS campaigned on an anti-corruption platform, although Aleksandar Pavković, a Macquarie University professor, noted that there was no evidence that the platform decreased corruption. SNS also based its platform on criticising its opponents, especially DS. In the parliamentary election, the SNS-led coalition won a majority of 158 seats in the National Assembly. Simultaneously, the City Assembly elections were held in Belgrade, in which the SNS-led coalition won 63 out of 110 seats. Siniša Mali, an independent nominated by SNS, was elected mayor of Belgrade on 24 April 2014. Vučić was elected and sworn in as prime minister three days later. His first cabinet was mostly composed of SNS and SPS individuals. The United States Agency for International Development (USAID) noted that the SNS now had "complete political dominance" due to the status of Vučić as prime minister. BBC News described the victory as an "unprecedented event". In October 2014, Radomir Nikolić, the son of President Nikolić, was brought to power in Kragujevac, the fourth largest city in Serbia by population, after successfully removing Veroljub Stevanović from power after a vote of no confidence. By early 2015, SNS reported that it had around 500,000 members. Since coming to power, no major protests in Serbia were held until the anti-government protests in April 2015. The Do not let Belgrade drown (NDB) initiative, which headed the protests, opposed the Belgrade Waterfront, an urban development project headed by the Government of Serbia; one of its representatives described it as a "big scam". The project previously received criticism, with Milan Nešić, a Radio Free Europe journalist, describing it as a "pre-election trick". The protests lasted up to September 2015. After the cuts in public sector, protests were also held in December 2015. Freedom House criticised the SNS-led government by stating that it displayed "a sharp intolerance for any kind of criticism either from opposition parties, independent media, civil society, or even ordinary citizens".

In January 2016, Vučić announced that parliamentary elections will be held in April 2016. Der Standard, an Austrian daily newspaper, stated that "he [Vučić] now has an absolute majority, and he wants to insure it for the next four years". Vučić stated that the reason behind the snap election was to "ensure a fresh mandate to push European Union accession". SNS began its campaign in late February 2016. In early March, President Nikolić dissolved the National Assembly and scheduled the parliamentary elections for 24 April 2016. This time, SNS took part under the "Serbia Is Winning" banner, while individuals from the Party of United Pensioners of Serbia (PUPS) and Serbian People's Party (SNP) were also on its ballot list, including individuals from parties that took part with SNS in the 2014 election. It was also reported that Aleksandar Martinović would replace Babić as the head of the SNS parliamentary group. During the campaign, SNS expressed its support for the European Union and military neutrality, while maintaining cooperation with NATO, and ensuring economic reforms, and a Western-type economy. The Organisation for Security and Co-operation in Europe (OSCE) noted that billboards and posters that promoted SNS were dominant during the campaign. In the parliamentary election, the SNS-led coalition won a majority of 131 seats in the National Assembly. Simultaneously, the provincial election was held in Vojvodina, in which SNS won 63 out of 120 seats in the Assembly of Vojvodina. Florian Bieber, a Luxembourgian political scientist, noted that "the landslide victory did not come as a surprise". DS, DSS, the Social Democratic Party (SDS), Liberal Democratic Party (LDP), League of Social Democrats of Vojvodina (LSV), Dveri, and Enough is Enough (DJB), all whom were in opposition to SNS, claimed that SNS allegedly stole the elections. Shortly after the election, opposition parties organsed a protest in Belgrade. Another series of anti-government protests began in Belgrade in May 2016 after the demolition of private objects in Savamala, an urban neighbourhood in Belgrade where the Belgrade Waterfront project is supposed to be built. The NDB initiative organised the protests which ended up lasting until October 2016. Vučić was re-elected president of SNS in May 2016. Igor Mirović was elected president of the Government of Vojvodina in June 2016. Vučić was given the mandate by President Nikolić to form a government, which he did with SPS in August 2016. Ana Brnabić, an openly lesbian and independent politician, was appointed minister in the Vučić's cabinet. In December 2016, Vučić affirmed that he would not run in the 2017 presidential election, although he also stated that the main body of SNS would decide its presidential candidate.

2017–2019 

In January 2017, President Nikolić stated that he would want to run for re-election, although ministers such as Zorana Mihajlović and Aleksandar Vulin persuaded Vučić to run instead. A month later, SNS announced Vučić as its presidential candidate. Vučić received support from the coalition partners of SNS, and SPS, Alliance of Vojvodina Hungarians (VMSZ), and United Serbia (JS). During the campaign period, it was reported that major newspapers, such as Alo!, Blic, Večernje novosti, Politika, Dnevnik, Kurir, and Srpski telegraf, printed campaign posters of SNS on its front pages; Voice of America reported it as an "unprecedented move". Vučić campaigned on raising living standards, selling or shutting down state-owned companies, and austerity cuts. Robert Creamer, an American political consultant, criticised him and stated that "Vučić would be in a position to select a prime minister of his choice, [and] control the judiciary, and the election apparatus — eliminating all checks and balances in the Serbian government". In the presidential election, Vučić won 55% of the popular vote in the first run-off. Shortly after his election, mass protests erupted in Belgrade, Novi Sad, Niš, and other locations across Serbia. The protests lasted until Vučić's inauguration, which occurred on 31 May 2017. In June 2017, Vučić proposed Brnabić as prime minister. She was sworn in on 29 June 2017. Radio Free Europe noted that, even though the presidency is a ceremonial role, Vučić has retained de facto power of SNS, while the Belgrade Centre for Human Rights noted that the political system de facto turned into a presidential one, similar to the era of Slobodan Milošević. , a journalist for Danas, reported that by October 2017 SNS was close to reaching 600,000 members.

SNS announced its participation in the 2018 Belgrade City Assembly election under the "Because We Love Belgrade" banner in January 2018. Zoran Radojičić, a paediatric surgeon, was chosen to be the first candidate on its ballot list. At a conference in Belgrade Youth Center in February 2018, its ballot list candidates and election program were presented. In the City Assembly election, SNS won 64 seats. , a non-governmental organisation, noted that SNS mostly criticised opposition politicians during the campaign period. Radojičić replaced Mali and was appointed mayor in June 2018. In July 2018, political scientist Boban Stojanović noted that SNS had around 700,000 members. A series of anti-government protests began in December 2018 after an assault on Borko Stefanović, an opposition politician. The demonstrators criticised Vučić and SNS, demanded the end to political violence and stifling media freedom and freedom of expression. The protests, which were attended by tens of thousands, continued into 2019. In January 2019, SNS organised a meeting in support of Vladimir Putin's visit to Belgrade. A month later, SNS launched a campaign named "Future of Serbia", in contrary to the anti-government protests. Journalist Slobodan Georgiev noted that the campaign effectively silenced the protests. Prime Minister Brnabić joined SNS in October 2019.

2020–2022 

In January 2020, Vučić announced that the electoral threshold would be lowered to 3 per cent. Critics saw this as a way that SNS would allow the "controlled opposition" to enter the National Assembly. SNS announced in February 2020 that it would take part under the "For Our Children" banner in the 2020 parliamentary election, stating that more than 50 per cent of its ballot list would be comprised young people. The SNS-led ballot list was headed over to the Republic Electoral Commission (RIK) on 5 March, although the government postponed the election on 16 March due to the beginning of the COVID-19 pandemic in Serbia. Initially supposed to be held on 26 April, the election was postponed to 21 June 2020. In the same month, the anti-government protests which began in December 2018, formally ended in March 2020 due to the COVID-19 pandemic. The Alliance for Serbia (SzS), the major opposition alliance, announced that it would boycott the election, claiming that the elections "would not be free and fair". Freedom House stated in May 2020 that it labelled Serbia as a hybrid regime, citing alleged "increased state capture, abuse of power, and terror tactics" by Vučić. In June 2020, newspaper Danas reported that SNS had over 800,000 members. In the parliamentary election, the SNS-led coalition won a supermajority of 188 seats; alongside SNS, the SPS–JS coalition and the Serbian Patriotic Alliance (SPAS) only crossed the electoral threshold. Vučić described it as "historical moment". Journalist Milenko Vasović saw the SNS election campaign as a promotion of Vučić and not the party itself. Simultaneously, a provincial election was held in Vojvodina in which SNS also won a supermajority of 76 seats. CeSID concluded that the election was met with "minimum democratic standards", while OSCE characterised that the election was met with political polarisation. Bieber described it as a pyrrhic victory for SNS, and noted that the incoming legislation would not include opposition parties. Although, journalist Patrick Kingsley stated that the election could allow "for greater momentum in peace talks with Kosovo". After gaining a supermajority in the National Assembly, the Government of Serbia submitted a constitutional amendment regarding judiciary. In early July 2020, a series of protests and riots against Vučić and the announced tightening of measures due to the spread of COVID-19 began in Belgrade. It was reported that demonstrators took a peaceful approach in the protests, although that a group of far-right demonstrators also stormed the building of the National Assembly; the police shortly after cleared the building, although the clashes continued outside. The government responded by taking a violent approach towards the protests. The protests lasted until the first constitutive session of the post-2020 election legislation, which occurred on 3 August 2020. After the first constitutive session, the SNS parliamentary group changed its name to "Aleksandar Vučić – For Our Children". In September 2020, it was announced that SNS had around 750,000 members. Prime Minister Brnabić was re-elected in October 2020, while her new cabinet was mostly composed of members of SNS, SPS, and SPAS. The National Assembly adopted the proposal for constitutional changes in December 2020.

Vučić announced in early May 2021 that he submitted a proposal to merge SPAS into SNS. Aleksandar Šapić, the leader of SPAS, stated that he supported the proposal. The merge was completed on 26 May, after which Šapić was appointed vice-president of SNS, while SPAS MPs joined SNS in June 2021. Dialogues to improve election conditions between government and opposition parties, in which SNS took part, began in May 2021 and lasted until late October 2021. A series of environmental protests began in September 2021 due to the concerns about the Project Jadar, a lithium mining project headed by Rio Tinto, an Anglo-Australian mining company. The Government of Serbia supported the Project Jadar, whilst SNS also officials criticised the protests. The protests lasted until 15 February 2022. The Government of Serbia adopted changes for the law on referendum and people's initiative on 10 November 2021. The changes received criticism due to the abolishment of the 50% turnout that was needed for referendums to pass. At the end of the November 2021, Vučić was re-elected president of SNS. In January 2022, a constitutional referendum was held. A majority of 60% of voters voted in favour of proposed changes, an option which was supported by SNS. In preparation for the 2022 general election, SNS and SPS announced that they would not run on a joint parliamentary list and that SPS would support the presidential candidate of SNS. Additionally, SNS announced Šapić as its mayoral candidate for the Belgrade City Assembly election. The National Assembly was dissolved in February 2022 to call snap parliamentary elections; presidential elections were called next month. In the 2022 election, SNS took part under the "Together We Can Do Everything" banner, while Vučić was announced as the presidential candidate of SNS in March 2022. Transparency Serbia noted that SNS had "a significant domination in the media" during the campaign period, while CRTA alleged that the campaign period was met in worse conditions than in 2020. In the presidential election, Vučić was re-elected after winning 60% of the popular vote, while in the parliamentary election, the SNS-led coalition won 120 seats. In the Belgrade City Assembly election, the SNS-led coalition won 48 seats. Šapić was elected mayor of Belgrade in June 2022. Milenko Jovanov was appointed head of the SNS parliamentary group in August 2022, replacing Martinović, who was its head since 2016. Later that month, Prime Minister Brnabić was given another mandate to form a government. The composition of her third cabinet was announced on 23 October, while the cabinet was sworn in on 26 October.

2023–present 
In February 2023, two MPs as well as two members of the City Assembly of Belgrade formerly affiliated with the Serbian Party Oathkeepers defected to SNS, citing their disapproval with their former party's leader. Later that month, another member of the City Assembly of Belgrade defected to SNS. Beginning in September 2022, speculations arose whether Vučić would form a separate political party. Vučić confirmed the formation of the People's Movement for the State, a political movement, in March 2023. Vučić also announced that SNS will hold a party assembly on 27 May 2023.

Ideology and platform

Domestic policies 
Following the establishment of SNS, Aleksandar Vučić denounced his previous support for the establishment of Greater Serbia, while Tomislav Nikolić stated that SNS would continue the accession of Serbia to the European Union. SNS declared its main tasks to be "fight against corruption and the realisation of the rule of law", while describing itself as a "state-building party". Its white paper (election program) was published in October 2011. Jovan Teokarević, an associate professor at the Belgrade Faculty of Political Sciences, described their ideological orientation as a "complete u-turn" in comparison with the Serbian Radical Party (SRS). Bojana Barlovac, a Balkan Insight journalist, stated that SNS "became much closer to DS on its policy profile", although in 2013, she described the party as conservative. Eric Gordy, a professor at the University College London, considers SNS to be a party "based around [Vučić]".

SNS has been described as a populist party. Biserko stated that SNS is populist and that it built its ideological image on "social dissatisfaction". Dan Bilefsky, a New York Times journalist, also described the party as populist. Zoran Lutovac, a political scientist and future president of DS, described SNS as populist. He also added that SNS does not have a "coherent ideology" and that its coalition "includes everyone, regardless of its ideology". Scholars and political scientists such as Justin Vaïsse, Chiara Milan, and Florian Bieber also agreed that SNS is populist. The Organization for Security and Co-operation in Europe (OSCE) described SNS as populist as early as in January 2009. Sociologist Jovo Bakić described SNS as a "pragmatically re-profiled" and moderately conservative party, and compared its development to Gianfranco Fini's projects in Italy. Additionally, he stated that "since its foundation SNS had wanted to remodel itself as a conservative party". Scholars and journalists had also described SNS as conservative, liberal-conservative, and national-conservative. Marko Stojić, a Metropolitan University Prague lecturer, stated that "even though SNS claimed it was conservative" it cannot be described as conservative due to its pragmatic and weak ideological profile. SNS is economically neoliberal, and it advocates for austerity, market economy reforms, privatisation, reduced spending, and liberalisation of labour laws. Stojiljković and Spasojević noted that SNS already displayed their neoliberal position during the 2012 election period, and that SNS campaigned on significantly reducing subsidies, but also the number of MPs, ministries, agencies, institutes, and the state administration. Additionally, Stojiljković described its position as "neoliberal populist". SNS has enacted centralisation policies, especially in Vojvodina.

Zoran Stojiljković and Dušan Spasojević, professors at the Belgrade Faculty of Political Sciences, noted that following the formation of SNS, the Serbian political system acquired characteristics of moderate pluralism, and described SNS as a catch-all party. Additionally, they noted that SNS was formed as a centre-right party, although that its image shifted to the centre after the 2012 elections. Stojiljković and Spasojević also noted that SNS showed "clear populistic elements", and that "populist ideas are integral and important for its ideological profile". Stojić also noted that SNS has an eclectic and weekly-rooted ideological profile and that it lacks firm political principles, while he also described SNS as a "typical catch-all party". Radio Free Europe also described the party as centrist and catch-all, although it noted that "some analysts also stated that the party is right-leaning and conservative". Bieber described SNS centre-right but also as "non-ideological". BBC News noted that SNS "does not have a clear programmatic nor ideological vision", and added that SNS functions as a catch-all party. Bojan Klačar of CeSID stated that SNS "espouses a right-of-centre ideology", but stated that "more importantly, SNS is a catch-all party" that captures a wide variety of opinions, and that SNS can be also considered to be liberal and pro-European. Political scientists Đorđe Pavićević and Boban Stojanović, journalist Ivan Radovanović, and authors Aleksandar Marinković and Novak Gajić also described SNS as a catch-all party. Political scientist Vassilis Petsinis stated that SNS took advantage of fragmentation of centrist and centre-right political parties and that it has consolidated its grip on power by dominating the "continuum that stretches from the liberal centre to the conservative right". Additionally, Laurence Mitchell, an author, and Palgrave Macmillan in their The Statesman's Yearbook had described SNS as centrist, while George Vasilev, a La Trobe University lecturer, and Srđan Mladenov Jovanović, a scholar, described SNS as centre-right; some authors had also described it as a right-wing party.

Since coming to power in 2012, observers have assessed that Serbia has suffered from democratic backsliding into authoritarianism, followed by a decline in media freedom and civil liberties. A research that was conducted by Cenzolovka in 2015 noted that SNS used media outlets to further their influence. Additionally, SNS was accused of paying internet trolls to praise the government and condemn those who think the opposite on internet forums and social networks. In 2020, Twitter suspended 8,558 accounts that promoted SNS and Vučić, whilst criticising the opposition. Meta suspended 5,374 accounts and 12 Facebook groups that were connected to SNS in the fourth quarter of 2022, stating that the "SNS network functioned differently than traditional troll networks". Additionally, Meta revealed that SNS spent over USD$ 150,000 on advertising on Facebook and Instagram. In 2021, the V-Dem Institute categorised Serbia as an electoral autocracy; the institute also stated that the standards of judiciary and electoral integrity had declined in the past ten years. According to the Freedom House's report from 2022, SNS has "eroded political rights and civil liberties, put pressure on independent media, the political opposition, and civil society organisations". Additionally, it reported that internet portals close to the government that "manipulate facts and slander independent media" continued to receive public funds on state and local levels. As a response, Vučić and Brnabić criticised Freedom House's report. In a Voice of America interview, Vladimir Orlić claimed that "Serbia is ranked higher than some EU countries on the freedom index".

Foreign policies 
Journalists have described SNS as pro-European. SNS advocates for close economic and political ties, as well as accession of Serbia to the European Union, alongside "productive ties" with Russia. Biserko stated that its support for European Union is rather a "declarative support", and not a substantial one. Stojić described SNS as "soft Euroenthusiast". Additionally, Vladimir Goati, a political scientist, described the position of SNS towards the European Union rather as pragmatic, than ideological, while economic anthropologist Jovana Diković described SNS as "euro-pragmatic". In a 2014 report, Freedom House noted that the SNS-led government advanced Serbia's efforts regarding the European Union. Dragan Đukanović, a Belgrade Faculty of Political Sciences professor, noted that SNS received support from the U.S. and European Union due to its pro-European agenda. Sonja Biserko, a human rights activist, argued in 2013 that SNS declaratively adopted the agenda of DS and the Liberal Democratic Party (LDP) regarding the views on the European Union. Jacobin, an American socialist magazine, described SNS as a fusion of "a nationalist, pro-Russian wing and a modernizing, pro-European wing", while describing Nikolić as being represented in the pro-Russian wing, and Vučić in the pro-European wing, although that the both wings agree on neoliberal austerity. A European Parliament-published study noted that the SNS-led government continued the "four-pillar policy", a policy that seeks cooperation with European Union, United States, Russia, and China, which was introduced by Boris Tadić, the former president of Serbia and leader of DS. During the 2015 European migrant crisis, the SNS-led government did not impose any restrictions on migrants while crossing into the European Union, which author Vedran Džihić as a pragmatic move. Stojić described the move as "populist-Euroenthusiastic". SNS supports military neutrality and it opposes joining NATO, although Serbia has continued militarily cooperating with NATO.

Demographic characteristics 
Political scientist Slaviša Orlović noted in 2011 that supporters of SNS tended to be the unemployed, pensioners, and housewifes. According to the Centre for Free Elections and Democracy (CeSID) in 2012, a majority of SNS supporters were male, primary or high school educated, workers', technicians, and dependents, while they had a widespread age structure. In 2014, CeSID reported that its voting base now mostly consisted of people over age of 50, while ideologically speaking, they did not possess any dominant value determination. According to a 2016 opinion poll conducted by Nova srpska politička misao, most of its supporters were over 60 years old, while only 12% of its supporters were highly educated.

Organisation 
SNS has a presidency which acts as the operational and political body of the party; it is composed of 30 members. It also has a main board and an executive board. The current president of SNS is Aleksandar Vučić, who was elected in 2012 and most recently re-elected in 2021; Jorgovanka Tabaković is the deputy president. Aleksandar Šapić, Ana Brnabić, Marko Đurić, Miloš Vučević, Nevena Đurić, Siniša Mali, and Vladimir Orlić are the current vice-presidents of SNS; all of them were elected in 2021. Milenko Jovanov has been the head of the SNS parliamentary group since 2022.

The headquarters of SNS are located at Palmira Toljatija 5/3 in Belgrade. SNS publishes SNS Informator, the party's newspaper. It also has a youth and women's wing. SNS has received most of its support because of Vučić; an opinion poll conducted by Faktor Plus in December 2014 noted that 80% of SNS voters would not vote for SNS if someone else than Vučić was the head of the party. With at least 800,000 members as of 2020, SNS is the largest political party in Europe by membership as of 2019.

International cooperation 
SNS representatives in the Parliamentary Assembly of the Council of Europe joined the European People's Party (EPP) in 2013. In the same year, SNS received support from the Christian Democratic Union of Germany (CDU) due to the establishment of the Brussels Agreement. SNS has received support from the CDU in regards to membership in the EPP in 2015. A year later, SNS and its youth wing became associate members of EPP. SNS officials attended CDU's congress in 2018. SNS became a member of the International Democrat Union in 2018.

SNS took part in a meeting with Chinese Communist Party (CCP) officials in 2019. At the meeting, the parties "pledged to forge ever-closer links". SNS officials were also present in a 2021 summit that was organised by CCP. SNS established connections with United Russia (YeR) in 2010. Tomislav Nikolić was present at a YeR congress in 2011, while a year later, SNS officials were present at a YeR conference. Since then, SNS and YeR have signed several cooperation agreements, most recently being in 2021.

In 2011, SNS signed a cooperation agreement with the Freedom Party of Austria. SNS also cooperated with Fidesz, the ruling party of Hungary; Fidesz members attended a SNS rally in 2019. In 2014, it was reported that SNS had ties with the New Serb Democracy in Montenegro, while SNS officials also attended a Democratic Party of Socialists (DPS) rally in 2015. SNS has been accused of "practically running" the Serb List in Kosovo, while Vučić has been also accused of being "figure behind" the party.

List of presidents

Electoral performance

Parliamentary elections

Presidential elections

Provincial elections

Belgrade City Assembly elections

References

Primary sources 
In the text these references are preceded by a double dagger (‡):

External links 

 
 

Serbian Progressive Party